{|
|+Samuel de Champlain

{{Infobox ship career
| Hide header=
| Ship name=*Musketeer Fury (1976-1978)
Tender Panther (1978-1979)
Margarita (1979-1983)
Vortice (1983-1999)
Norfolk (1999-2006)
Samuel de Champlain (2006-present)
| Ship owner=Lafarge North America
| Ship operator=*Andrie Inc.
| Ship registry=Cleveland, OH, USA
| Ship route=
| Ship ordered=
| Ship builder=Mangone Shipbuilding
| Ship original cost=
| Ship yard number=
| Ship way number=
| Ship laid down=
| Ship launched=1976
| Ship completed=
| Ship christened=
| Ship acquired=
| Ship maiden voyage=
| Ship in service=
| Ship out of service=
| Ship identification=*

Callsign: WDC8307
| Ship fate=
| Ship status=
| Ship notes=
}}

|}Samuel de Champlain is a large, twin-screw tugboat owned by Lafarge North America and managed by Andrie Inc. The vessel is paired with the cement barge Innovation, transporting cement products between Lafarge facilities across the Great Lakes.

History

In 1976, this vessel, now known as Samuel de Champlain, was built as Musketeer Fury by Mangone Shipbuilding of Houston, Texas for Bernhard Hansen and Company of Norway.

Two years later in 1978, the tug was sold and renamed Tender Panther. The tug was sold again in 1979 and renamed Margarita. In 1983, the tug changed hands for the third time and was renamed Vortice. In 1993, after ten years sailing as Vortice, the vessel suffered a major fire near the islands of Azores. Having become a burnt-out hull, Vortice was laid up in Trieste, Italy. In 1996, the Canadian company McKeil Marine purchased the hull and towed it across the Atlantic to the company's yard in Hamilton, Ontario. In 1999, Vortice was sold to Seaforce Marine Incorporated of Norfolk, Virginia where the tug was completely rebuilt and renamed Norfolk.

In 2006, Norfolk was purchased by Lafarge North America and renamed Samuel de Champlain after the French explorer. The tug was modified with a Bludworth coupler system by Manitowoc Marine Group so it would be compatible with the 460 foot-long cement barge Innovation''. The barge is capable of carrying up to 19,449 short tons of cement.

References

Tugboats
Tugboats of the United States
Tugboats of Canada